Watered Down may refer to:

Music

Albums
Watered Down, a 1968 album by The Starlets, a girl group of which Minnie Riperton was a member

Songs
"Watered Down", from the 2003 Paint It Black album CVA
"Watered Down", from the 2009 The Used album Artwork
"Watered Down", from the 2013 Swearin' album Surfing Strange
"Watered Down", from the 2017 Trace Adkins album Something's Going On

Television
"Watered Down", a 1995 episode of VR Troopers
"Watered Down", a 2003 episode of Kevin Spencer